Lieutenant General Hla Min was the minister of the Ministry of Defense, which oversees the Tatmadaw, the country's armed forces. He was appointed by the Pyidaungsu Hluttaw on 30 March 2011. He was reassigned to the military in September 2012. He was retired from army in August 2015 and joined the Union Solidarity and Development Party to contest 2015 Myanmar general election.

References

Defence ministers of Myanmar
1958 births
Living people
Union Solidarity and Development Party politicians
Burmese generals